Gabriele Schnaut (born 24 February 1951) is a German classical singer who started her operatic career as a mezzo-soprano in 1976 and changed to dramatic soprano in 1985. She has appeared internationally and performed at the Bayreuth Festival from 1977 to 2000. She recorded works by composers of the 20th century and appeared in the premieres of operas by Wolfgang Rihm and Jörg Widmann.

Career 

Born in Mannheim, Schnaut grew up in Mainz and received violin and singing lessons as a child. She studied first at the Peter Cornelius Conservatory of Mainz, majoring in violin, and at the same time musicology at the University of Mainz. From 1971 she studied singing at the Frankfurt University of Music and Performing Arts with Elsa Cavelti. Her first permanent engagement was as a mezzo-soprano in 1976 at the Staatsoper Stuttgart.

In 1977 Schnaut made her debut at the Bayreuth Festival, singing Waltraute and the Second Norn in the Jahrhundertring staged by Patrice Chéreau. She appears in these roles in the film Der Ring des Nibelungen. She performed at the festival in 1980 Wellgunde in Götterdämmerung, in 1985 Venus in Tannhäuser and the Third Norn, in 1986 Sieglinde in Die Walküre, in 1987 Ortrud in Lohengrin, and in 2000 Brünnhilde in Der Ring des Nibelungen.

Schnaut was a member of the Staatstheater Darmstadt (1978–1980), the Nationaltheater Mannheim (1980–1988), where she performed the part of Ophelia in the premiere of Wolfgang Rihm's Die Hamletmaschine. From 1988 she was a member of the Deutsche Oper am Rhein in Düsseldorf, from 1995 a member of the Hamburgische Staatsoper, at present of the Bayerische Staatsoper (as of 2013).

In private study with Hanne-Lore Kuhse in East Berlin she developed to a dramatic soprano. In 1985 she sang the title role of Wagner's Tristan und Isolde at the Theater Dortmund. In 1994 she appeared at La Scala in the title role of Elektra by Richard Strauss and as Brünnhilde in Die Walküre. In this role she made her debut at the Metropolitan Opera in 1996. She performed the part such as Kundry in Parsifal at the Wiener Staatsoper from 1996. In Hamburg she sang both the dyer's wife and the nurse in Die Frau ohne Schatten by Richard Strauss. In 1992 she appeared on the occasion of the Summer Olympics in Barcelona, both as Venus in Wagner's Tannhäuser in a Hamburg production staged by Harry Kupfer, and in the part of Waldvogel in Arnold Schönberg's Gurre-Lieder. She performed the title roles of Tosca and Turandot, recorded on DVD at the Salzburg Festival in 2002.

In Munich she performed the part of Emilia Marty in Janáček's Věc Makropulos and mezzo roles Klytämnestra in Elektra and Herodias in Salome. In 2006 she sang the premiere of Wolfgang Rihm's Das Gehege, a monodrama commissioned by the State Opera to be combined in a double bill with Salome, both directed by William Friedkin. She appeared as Euphrat in the premiere of Jörg Widmann's Babylon in October 2012, conducted by Kent Nagano. In 2013 she portrayed the desperate character of the sacristan Buryja in Janáček's Jenufa like a heroine from ancient tragedy, but with tentative gestures of affection, as a review notes.

She has been teaching voice at the Universität der Künste Berlin.

Recordings 
In the 1970s, Schnaut recorded with Helmuth Rilling and the Gächinger Kantorei sacred and secular cantatas by Johann Sebastian Bach and his St Matthew Passion, singing alto parts and one soprano part. She appears as Waltraute and Second Norn in the film of the Jahrhundertring, filmed in 1980. She recorded in 1988 works by Paul Hindemith, conducted by Gerd Albrecht, the part of Die Dame in Cardillac with Siegmund Nimsgern in the title role, and the part of the Woman in Mörder, Hoffnung der Frauen with Franz Grundheber as the Man. In 1989 she recorded Schreker's Der Schatzgräber, possibly the first recording of the opera, with Josef Protschka in the title role, again conducted by Albrecht.

Schnaut recorded Leonore in Beethoven's Fidelio with Christoph von Dohnányi (1990). A review devotes a paragraph to her performance, noting: Her vocal acting is excellent: an example is her eruption after the on-stage plotting ... She starts with steady, controlled recitative before moving into her truly dramatic soprano with some fairly horrible leaps which she hits well. If there is a suggestion of a lack of vocal strength in her lower register and a slight diminishing of tonal beauty on high, it is more than made up for by her evenness of head to chest transfers, her assurance of vocal line and the believable drama with which she invests the role.

In November 1992, she recorded Brünnhilde in Die Walküre with Dohnányi and the Cleveland Orchestra for Decca.

She performed the part of Iocaste in Stravinsky's Oedipus Rex with Paavo Järvi, Ortrud in Lohengrin as a DVD of the Bayreuth Festival with Peter Schneider (1990) and Puccini's Turandot as a DVD of the Salzburg Festival with Valery Gergiev (2002).

Awards 

In 2003 Schnaut was appointed a Bavarian Kammersängerin by the Bavarian Minister of Culture Hans Zehetmair. She is also a recipient of the Bavarian Order of Merit.

References

External links 

 
 
 Gabriele Schnaut Bayerisches Musiker Lexikon Online 
 Gabriele Schnaut management Künstleragentur Hilbert, Munich 
 Playing Ortrud (dressed in red), intimidating Elsa

1951 births
Living people
Musicians from Mannheim
Musicians from Mainz
German operatic sopranos
German operatic mezzo-sopranos
Frankfurt University of Music and Performing Arts alumni
20th-century German  women opera singers
21st-century German  women opera singers
Academic staff of the Berlin University of the Arts